The 2017—18 Brøndby IF season was Brøndby IF's 37th consecutive season in the top tier of Danish football, 28th consecutive in the Superligaen, and 52nd as a football club. Besides Superligaen, the club participated in DBU Pokalen and UEFA Europa League. It was the second season with manager Alexander Zorniger.

Club

First team staff

Administration

Players

First team 
Updated until May 2018:

Transfers

In

Out

Competitions

Superligaen

Main round

Results summary

Results after each round

Matches 
Brøndby IF's games in the main round 2017-18:

DBU Pokalen

UEFA Europa League

Pre-season friendlies

References 

Brøndby IF seasons
Danish football clubs 2017–18 season